Kino is a film-making movement that advocates the production of short-films on little to no budget, using small crews, and non-competitive collaboration. There are Kino Groups around the world. Kino is divided into individual cells, or chapters, most of which have a monthly screening where member directors and guests can screen their films. Cells may also feature "Kino Kabarets", where members of the public are invited to collaborate and create films.

History 
The Kino movement was founded in 1999 in Montreal, Quebec, Canada by Christian Laurence and friends. It has since spread worldwide (mostly in French-speaking countries and central Europe), and is now composed of over 70 physical cells, as well as many Facebook groups.

References

External links 

Kino groups repertoire
 Kino Kabaret event calendar (Multilingual)
Kino on Archive.org

Film organizations
Film societies
1999 establishments in Quebec